Streptochaeta is a genus of plants in the grass family. It is the only genus in the tribe Streptochaeteae of the family Poaceae.

The species of Streptochaeta are native to Neotropical realm regions of North America, the Caribbean, Central America, and/or South America.

Species
Species include:
 Streptochaeta angustifolia Soderstr. —  endemic to Espírito Santo state of southeastern Brazil, not seen in wild since 1972 and possibly an extinct species.
 Streptochaeta sodiroana Hack. — Chiapas and Tabasco states of southern Mexico; all Central American countries except El Salvador; Ecuador; Peru; and Venezuela.
 Streptochaeta spicata Schrad. ex Nees in C.F.P.von Martius — widespread from Veracruz (México), the Caribbean to Trinidad island, and South America to Paraguay.

References

External links
 

Poaceae genera
Grasses of North America
Grasses of South America
Flora of Central America
Flora of the Caribbean
Neotropical realm flora
Taxa named by Christian Gottfried Daniel Nees von Esenbeck
Poaceae